Robert Anthony McGowan (May 22, 1901 – June 20, 1955) was an American screenwriter and film director.

Biography
Born in Denver, McGowan is best known as a junior director for the Our Gang short subjects film series from 1926 to 1930, and as the co-writer of the series during the Metro-Goldwyn-Mayer period from 1938 to 1944. McGowan was named for his uncle, Our Gang senior director Robert F. McGowan. Since both Robert McGowans worked on the series, Robert Anthony McGowan was usually credited as Anthony Mack.

While McGowan directed a number of Our Gang entries in the late-1920s, his work is considered lesser than that of his uncle. He appears on-screen in the 1932 short Free Wheeling, in which he is socked by a boxing glove attached to the kids' makeshift taxi.

Personal
McGowan married Madeline Rosselle, the daughter of a choreographer, and had two children. His daughter Mickie McGowan (1938-2022) was a voice actor, casting agent, and ADR director. McGowan's personal memorabilia was destroyed.

Death
His career came to an end during the Communist "witch hunt" era of the late-1940s, during which he was blacklisted for associating with blacklisted screenwriters. He died in Los Angeles, California on June 20, 1955, five months after his uncle, at the age of 54, on the day of the longest solar eclipse in that century.

Selected filmography

Screenwriter
 Gas House Kids Go West (1947)

Director

 War Feathers (1926)
 Telling Whoppers (1926)
 Bring Home the Turkey (1927)
 Ten Years Old (1927)
 Tired Business Men (1927)
 Olympic Games (1927)
 Chicken Feed (1927)
 Heebee Jeebees (1927)
 Dog Heaven (1927)
 Playin' Hookey (1928)
 Rainy Days (1928)
 Edison, Marconi & Co. (1928)
 School Begins (1928)
 Growing Pains (1928)
 Old Gray Hoss (1928)
 Election Day (1929)
 The Holy Terror (1929)
 Boxing Gloves (1929)
 Cat, Dog, & Co. (1929)
 Shivering Shakespeare (1930)

External links

American film directors
Hal Roach Studios filmmakers
Hollywood blacklist
Writers from Denver
1901 births
1955 deaths